The China Bowl is the season ending championship game for the China Arena Football League (CAFL).

Trophy
The China Bowl champion receives the Martin Judge Jr. Trophy

Results

References

Annual sporting events in China
2016 in Chinese sport
Indoor American football competitions